Aleksandr Sergeyevich Sokolov (born 1 March 1982) is a Russian volleyball player, who competes for Fakel and the national team. He has competed at the 2012 Summer Olympics, where Russia won the gold medal in the final against Brazil.

References 

1982 births
Living people
Russian men's volleyball players
Volleyball players at the 2012 Summer Olympics
Olympic volleyball players of Russia
Olympic gold medalists for Russia
Olympic medalists in volleyball
Medalists at the 2012 Summer Olympics
People from Kolomna
Universiade medalists in volleyball
Universiade gold medalists for Russia
Sportspeople from Moscow Oblast
20th-century Russian people
21st-century Russian people